Marcelino Domingo Sanjuán (26 April 1884 – 2 March 1939) was a Spanish teacher, journalist, and politician who served as a minister several times during the government of the Second Spanish Republic.

Biography

Early life & political career 
Born in Tarragona, he obtained the title of a teacher in the city in 1903. In the same year, he moved to Tortosa, where he began to teach and came into contact with republican cliques. In Tortosa, he directed republican newspaper El Pueblo.

His political career began in 1909 when he was elected a republican councillor for the Tortosa City Council. His influence in Republican groups was consolidated when he joined the General Council of the Republican Nationalist Federal Union (UFNR) and his subsequent election as a deputy in Cortes in the 1914 elections. However, he would leave the UFNR as a result of the failure of the electoral alliance with the radicals of Alejandro Lerroux in the 1914 elections.Domingo was linked to CNT. During his journalism career, he came to direct the Barcelona newspaper , and was editor of the newspaper . During the Spanish crisis of 1917, he would publish a famous article in La Lucha, "¿Qué espera el Rey?", in which he harshly criticized the monarchy.

His political activity increased during the Restoration and the dictatorship of Primo de Rivera. Domingo was the main advocate of the autonomy proposal for Catalonia, rejected by the monarchical Cortes in 1918; he also promoted the ephemeral republican platform Left Alliance, which would include PSOE and various republican groups.

In 1928, he published his essay Libertad y Autoridad in the Javier Morata Pedreño Vanguard Library collection in Madrid. In 1930, this publishing house also published his work ¿Qué espera el Rey?.

Second Republic 
In July 1929, together with Álvaro de Albornoz, Marcelino Domingo founded the Radical Socialist Republican Party, an organization from which he participated in 1934, together with Manuel Azaña from Republican Action and Santiago Casares Quiroga from Autonomous Galician Republican Organization, to form the Republican Left of Catalonia.

He was elected deputy for Barcelona district in the 1931 general elections. In the 1933 elections, however, he failed to recover his seat. He would once again become deputy for Barcelona in the 1936 elections.

Marcelino Domingo was Minister of Public Instruction during the First Biennium of the Republic, between April and December 1931. During his time as minister, he took significant measures such as restricting religious education, authorizing bilingualism in schools in Catalonia, and creating a program for the construction of new schools. After his dismissal from office, he would be replaced by Fernando de los Ríos.  Domingo would serve as Minister of Agriculture between December 1931 and June 1933, and again between June and September 1933. He would return to Public Instruction during the first government of the Popular Front, between February and May 1936.

See also 

 Radical Socialist Republican Party

References

External links 

Exiles of the Spanish Civil War in France
Radical Socialist Republican Party politicians
Republican Left (Spain) politicians
Spanish Freemasons
Education ministers of Spain
Industry ministers of Spain
Agriculture ministers of Spain
20th-century Spanish politicians
1884 births
1939 deaths